The 25th Annual Gotham Independent Film Awards, presented by the Independent Filmmaker Project, were held on November 30, 2015. The nominees were announced on October 22, 2015. The ceremony was hosted by Abbi Jacobson and Ilana Glazer.

Winners and nominees

Film

Television

Special awards

Special Jury Award – Ensemble Performance
 Spotlight – Mark Ruffalo, Michael Keaton, Rachel McAdams, John Slattery, Stanley Tucci, Brian d'Arcy James, Liev Schreiber, and Billy CrudupSpotlight on Women Filmmakers "Live the Dream" Grant
 Chanelle Aponte Pearson – 195 Lewis
 Claire Carré – Embers
 Deb Shoval – AWOL

Gotham Appreciation Award
 Ellen Cotter of Angelika Film Center Theaters

Gotham Tributes
 Steve Golin
 Todd Haynes
 Helen Mirren
 Robert Redford

References

External links
 

2015 film awards
2015